Jeff Smith (born December 9, 1973) is an American politician who served as a member of the Missouri Senate, representing the 4th district from 2007 until 2009. His district covered the western portion of the City of St. Louis.

Prior to his political career, Smith co-founded Confluence Academies, a group of urban charter schools in St. Louis that now enroll nearly 4,000 students. He also authored a successful and critically acclaimed book chronicling the injustices faced by those incarcerated, Mr. Smith Goes to Prison. excerpted by Politico. Smith continues his community work as the executive vice president of community engagement and policy at Concordance Academy, a St. Louis-based nonprofit that provides comprehensive re-entry services to individuals returning to the community after prison.

Early life and education
Smith was raised in the St. Louis suburb of Olivette, Missouri and graduated from Ladue Horton Watkins High School. He attended the University of North Carolina at Chapel Hill, graduating Phi Beta Kappa with a double major in African-American Studies and political science. He received his MA and PhD in political science from Washington University in St. Louis.

Career

Academics 
Smith has taught as an adjunct and visiting professor at Washington University in St. Louis, the University of Missouri–St. Louis, and Dartmouth College and won the 2002 Washington University in St. Louis Dean's Award for Teaching Excellence. During his time at Dartmouth, he dated one of his students, future political strategist Lis Smith. In 2001, Smith co-founded the Confluence Academy, a charter school in North St. Louis focusing on math and science education.

2004 U.S. House campaign

In 2004, Smith was a candidate in the crowded Democratic primary election for the U.S. House of Representatives to replace retiring Congressman Dick Gephardt. Beginning as an unknown, Smith finished second in the ten-candidate field, narrowly losing to Russ Carnahan. His campaign was widely recognized as an example of successful grassroots organizing. It was the subject of the documentary film Can Mr. Smith Get to Washington Anymore?, which won the 2006 audience choice award at the Silverdocs film festival. In February 2007, the documentary aired on the award-winning PBS series Independent Lens.

Criminal conviction
In the primary approach to the 2004 congressional election, a representative, unknown at the time to be working for a group called Voters for Truth, approached members of Smith's campaign staff, offering to create and send out campaign mail regarding opponent Russ Carnahan's inconsistent voting record. Campaign staff subsequently approached Smith, who told them he had no opinion on the issue, and regardless of what decision they came to, not to share with him any of the details in order to avoid the possibility of campaign malfeasance. In September 2004, Smith submitted an affidavit to the Federal Election Commission relating to an accused conspiracy with the group Voters for Truth, occurring in the summer of 2004. Smith certified that he knew nothing in detail regarding the mailing sent by Voters for Truth.

In January 2009, the FBI and the U.S. Attorney's Office, acting upon newly discovered information, opened a criminal investigation to determine whether anyone had attempted to obstruct the Federal Election Commission proceeding. Smith's former friend and associate Steve Brown was approached by the FBI to wear a wire. Brown escaped a jail sentence by recording conversations with Smith, in which Brown deliberately brought up the topic of the campaign mailings. Smith pleaded guilty to two felony counts of conspiracy to obstruct justice. Each conspiracy count is punishable by up to 20 years in prison and $250,000 in fines. He resigned effective August 25, 2009, and was sentenced to one year and a day of prison. He also was fined $50,000.

Smith and his lawyer requested two years of home confinement and full-time community service, during which Smith would be allowed to leave his home only to teach civics and coach basketball at Confluence Academy, without pay. It would've saved taxpayers over $175,000: two years of a teacher's salary, plus the cost of housing a federal prisoner. More than 300 people, including a bipartisan group of the state's top elected officials, wrote public letters to the judge presiding over Smith's case, requesting clemency and arguing that—as Smith's prison counselor in Kentucky would later note—detaining Smith would be a waste of money and resources. However, Federal officials portrayed Smith as the mastermind of a "textbook case of political corruption" and pushed for a harsh sentence at the top of the federal guidelines. Smith was sentenced to one year and one day in prison. His lawyer subsequently requested Smith be sent to a prison camp in Marion, Illinois. However, Smith was sent to the camp at Federal Correctional Institution, Manchester in Kentucky. In late August 2010 he was released to a halfway house in St. Louis. In November 2010, he was released early from the halfway house and is no longer in federal custody.

Missouri Senate

2006 election
A year after his unsuccessful congressional campaign, Smith announced his intention to seek the Missouri Senate seat being vacated by Pat Dougherty. The race was heavily contested and other candidates included State Representatives Yaphett El-Amin, and Amber Boykins, former State Representative Derio Gambaro, and former St. Louis Alderman Kenny Jones. Smith won the primary election on August 8, 2006, and was unopposed in the general election.

Tenure
On December 22, 2008, Smith introduced Paternity Reform legislation in the Missouri State Senate. Sen. Smith's SB 140 created "fathering courts" throughout the state, while SB 141 is generally like the model legislation. Governor Jay Nixon signed both bills into law shortly after the 2009 legislative session. Smith also emerged in 2009 as the Legislature's leading advocate for historic preservation tax credits, and he sponsored and passed legislation creating a state Green Sales Tax Holiday eliminating sales tax on energy efficient appliances during the week of Earth Day each year.

Personal life
In spring 2011, Smith was married; in September of the same year, he and his wife Teresa had their first child, Charlie Wallace Smith. Smith accepted a professorship in urban policy at the New School's Milano Graduate School of Management and Urban Policy in New York City. He began writing for the website The Recovering Politician and contributing to Politico - The Arena. His writing has been published in Inc. magazine and praised in New York Magazine's Approval Matrix. In 2012, Smith gave a TED talk in New York titled "Lessons in business ... from prison". In 2015, Smith published a book, Mr. Smith Goes to Prison, which details his time in politics and federal prison.

See also
Campaign finance in the United States

References

External links
 Missouri Senate - Jeff Smith official government website
 Jeff Smith for Missouri Senate official campaign website, as of October 13, 2006
Follow the Money - Jeff Smith
2006 campaign contributions
CAN MR. SMITH GET TO WASHINGTON ANYMORE? site for Independent Lens on PBS
 Mo Senator Jeff Smith submits SB141 in Missouri MakeTheRealDadPay.org
  Paternity Fraud Reform Introduced in the Missouri Senate AllVoices.com
 Ex-Senator Jeff Smith: campaign lie landed me in jail  Radio Interview with The State We're In
 The Postcard Always Rings Twice segment from This American Life on the path that led to Jeff Smith's conviction

1973 births
Living people
Ladue Horton Watkins High School alumni
Democratic Party Missouri state senators
People convicted of obstruction of justice
Politicians from St. Louis County, Missouri
University of North Carolina at Chapel Hill alumni
Washington University in St. Louis alumni
Washington University in St. Louis faculty
Missouri politicians convicted of crimes